John O’Dwyer Creaghe (1841 – February 19, 1920), also known as Juan Creaghe, was an Irish-born anarchist.

Background
Creaghe was born in Limerick, Ireland in 1841, and in 1865 he graduated from the Royal College of Surgeons in Dublin, becoming a doctor. He opened up a practice in Mitchelstown in County Cork. In 1874, he emigrated to the capital of Argentina, Buenos Aires.

In Argentina
It is not known how Creaghe came in contact with anarchist ideas, since the country's anarchist movement was small at the time. It's speculated he may have come into contact with the Italian Anarchist Errico Malatesta, who was in Argentina between 1885 and 1889.

In England
In 1890, he moved to Sheffield, England, working in a poor working class district with many Irish immigrants. He became involved in the Socialist League, a Marxist group led by William Morris, but he soon broke away to form an anarchist group in Sheffield. On the group's first public appearance, it sported a banner reading "No God, No Master" at the May Day demonstration. The group soon also founded a club and a newspaper, the Sheffield Anarchist, which did not survive for long as it became caught up in the Walsall Anarchists' trial.

In 1891 Creaghe wrote "give me Anarchists willing to die NOW if necessary for Anarchy, and if you can find me 15 or 20 to join me I promise you we will make an oppression of the enemy"

Return to the Americas
In 1892, he left Sheffield to go back to Argentina via Liverpool, London, and Spain. He was involved in the founding of the Argentine Regional Workers' Federation, an anarchist trade union. He also contributed to the Ferrer free school movement inspired by the ideas of the Spanish anarchist pedagogue Francisco Ferrer, and director of the Rationalist School in Luján, Buenos Aires. In 1911, Creaghe left Argentina once again, eventually arriving in Los Angeles, where he collaborated with Mexican anarchists. He founded another newspaper, La Regeneración, and was friends with Ricardo Flores Magón. Both were involved in the Magonista rebellion of 1911 in Baja California; after the start of the Mexican Revolution, they supported the country's anarchist movement. Creaghe died on February 19, 1920, in a prison in Washington, DC.

References

1841 births
1920 deaths
Irish anarchists
Irish emigrants to Argentina
Irish emigrants to the United States (before 1923)
Magonists
People from County Limerick
Politics of Sheffield
Socialist League (UK, 1885) members